Giuseppe Baresi (born 7 February 1958) is an Italian football manager and former player, who played as a defender or as a defensive midfielder. He currently works as a technical assistant at Inter Milan. Baresi spent the majority of his 18-year career with Italian club Inter Milan, before retiring in 1994 after two seasons with Modena. With Inter, he won two Serie A titles and the UEFA Cup, among other trophies, and also served as the team's captain. At international level, he represented the Italy national team on 18 occasions between 1979 and 1986, taking part at UEFA Euro 1980, where they finished in fourth place, and at the 1986 FIFA World Cup. His younger brother, Franco Baresi, also a defender, served as captain for city rivals A.C. Milan and the Italian national side.

Club career

Born in Travagliato, province of Brescia, Baresi was acquired by Inter as a youngster, and became a member of the team's youth system. He made his professional debut with the senior side in the Coppa Italia on 8 June 1977, in a 1–0 win over Juventus during the 1976–77 season, and made his Serie A debut the following season. He later went on to captain the Milan-based club from 1988 to 1992, and he spent a total of 16 seasons with Internazionale, playing a total of 559 matches (including 392 Serie A matches, 73 European matches, and 94 Coppa Italia matches) and scoring 13 goals (ten in Serie A, one in European matches, and two in the Coppa Italia). With Inter, he won two Serie A titles, two Italian Cups, an UEFA Cup, and the Supercoppa Italiana. After leaving Inter at the end of the 1991–92 season, Baresi also played for Modena in the Serie B for a couple of seasons before retiring in 1994, at the age of 36.

International career
A long-standing nerazzurro, he also served as Internazionale captain for four seasons, winning several trophies both domestically and internationally. Despite his club success, Giuseppe achieved little success at the national team level, unlike his younger brother, only playing 18 matches with the Azzurri shirt between 1979 and 1986, being also surpassed in notoriety by his more famous brother Franco who played for crosstown city rivals Milan. After representing the under-20 side in the 1977 Under-20 World Cup, and the under-21 side in the 1978 and 1980 European championships, Giuseppe was a member of Italy's senior squad at the UEFA 1980 European Championship, on home soil, alongside his brother, Franco. This was the only time that the two brothers were both selected for a major tournament with Italy, although only Giuseppe would make appearances in the competition, as Italy managed to reach the semi-finals, finishing in fourth place. Despite being called up for the 1982 World Cup qualifiers by manager Enzo Bearzot, Giuseppe was left out of the final squad for his brother Franco; although the team went on to win the trophy, Franco did not make a single appearance throughout the tournament. Baresi was also a starting member of Italy's 1986 World Cup squad, which was eliminated in the round of 16.

Coaching career
After serving as head of Internazionale's club youth system, he was appointed assistant manager to new Internazionale manager José Mourinho on 2 June 2008. After Benitez was appointed he brought his own assistant coach Mauricio Pellegrino, while Baresi became a technical assistant. He returned to that position after Benitez was sacked and replaced by Leonardo. At the start of 2011–12 Serie A Gian Piero Gasperini brought his own assistant coach Bruno Caneo from Genoa but he was sacked in September. Claudio Ranieri replaced Gasperini while Baresi became the assistant coach, again from the position of technical assistant. When Roberto Mancini joined as head coach in 2014, Baresi was responsible for scouting and followed the development of players in the various Inter academies worldwide.

Style of play
A hard-working and tenacious ball-winner, with an excellent ability to read the game, Baresi was regarded as one of the best and most versatile Italian defenders of his generation, as he was capable of playing as a full-back, or as a defensive midfielder, in addition to his natural centreback role, due to his stamina.

Personal life

He is the older brother of former defender, and legendary Milan captain, Franco Baresi. As youngsters, both had tryouts for Inter, but Franco was rejected, and purchased by local rivals Milan; as he was the younger player, he was initially known as "Baresi 2". Due to Franco's great success and popularity later in his career, however, Giuseppe became known as "the other Baresi".
His daughter  Regina is also a footballer: she plays as striker and is the captain of Inter Women, the female squad of Inter Milan.

Honours
Inter Milan
Serie A: 1979–80, 1988–89
Coppa Italia: 1977–78, 1981–82
Supercoppa Italiana: 1989
UEFA Cup: 1990–91

Individual
Pirata d'Oro (Internazionale Player of the Year): 1986
Premio Nazionale Carriera Esemplare "Gaetano Scirea": 1992

References

External links
FIGC  

1958 births
Living people
Sportspeople from the Province of Brescia
Italian footballers
Association football defenders
Association football utility players
Inter Milan players
Modena F.C. players
Serie A players
Serie B players
UEFA Cup winning players
Italy youth international footballers
Italy under-21 international footballers
Italy international footballers
UEFA Euro 1980 players
1986 FIFA World Cup players
Footballers from Lombardy
Inter Milan non-playing staff